Artik is a 2019 American horror film written and directed by Tom Botchii. It stars Chase Williamson, Jerry G. Angelo and Lauren Ashley Carter. The film had its international premiere at Macabro and world premiere at Popcorn Frights.

Plot
A comic book obsessed serial killer Artik teaches his son how to avoid a series of brutal murders until the boy reaches a mysterious man who blocks everything.

Cast
Chase Williamson as Holton
Jerry G. Angelo as Artik
Lauren Ashley Carter as Flin Brays
Matt Mercer as Kar
Gavin White as Boy Adam

Reception

Critical response
Review aggregator website, Rotten Tomatoes gave it  rating, based on  reviews.

Accolades

References

External links

2019 horror films
American horror films
2010s English-language films
2010s American films